Tanja Tuomi (born 4 May 1996 in Tampere) is a Finnish tennis player.

Tuomi has a 2–2 record for Finland in Fed Cup competition.

Fed Cup participation

Singles

Doubles

References 
 
 
 

1996 births
Living people
Sportspeople from Tampere
Finnish female tennis players
20th-century Finnish women
21st-century Finnish women